The 1960 United States Senate election in Iowa took place on November 8, 1960. Incumbent Republican Senator Thomas E. Martin did not run for re-election to a second term. Jack Miller won the open seat by defeating Democratic Governor Herschel Loveless.

Republican primary

Candidates
Rollo Bergeson, former Iowa Secretary of State (1946–49)
Dayton Countryman, former Iowa Attorney General (1955–57) and candidate for Senate in 1956
Jack Miller, State Senator from Sioux City
Ernest Seemann, perennial candidate
Kenneth Stringer
Oliver Reeve

Results

Miller was formally nominated at a party convention.

General election

Results

See also 
 1960 United States Senate elections

References 

1960
Iowa
United States Senate